The initialism IWZ may refer to:
Impact Wrestling Zone
InstallShield WiZard (Project file extension used by InstallShield Express 1.0 and 2.x)